Frans Baillieu Möller (25 February 1897 in Malmö – 14 April 1995 in Lund) was a Swedish freestyle swimmer who competed in the 1920 Summer Olympics.

In 1920, he was a member of the Swedish relay team which finished fourth in the 4 x 200 metre freestyle relay competition. In the 1500 metre freestyle event he was eliminated in the first round.

References

1897 births
1995 deaths
Olympic swimmers of Sweden
Swimmers at the 1920 Summer Olympics
Swedish male freestyle swimmers
Sportspeople from Malmö